Christos Sirros (born 2 February 1948) is a politician in the Province of Quebec, Canada. He was a member of the National Assembly of Quebec (MNA) for the Laurier-Dorion riding for two decades as a member of the Liberal Party of Quebec.

A graduate from McGill University, he first won the Laurier riding in 1981, defeating Parti Québécois (PQ) candidate Nadia Assimopoulos. The riding of Laurier-Dorion was created for the 1994 election, in which Sirros defeated PQ candidate Benoît Henry by 6,930 votes. He was most notably the minister of Indian affairs under Robert Bourassa and minister of natural resources under Daniel Johnson, Jr. He was the National Assembly's first vice-president from June 2003 to July 2004.

Sirros left his seat in July 2004. He was then appointed Quebec Delegate General for Belgium and held that position until 2013. In December 2014, he was appointed the Quebec Delegate General for the United Kingdom.

Electoral record

 

 

 

|Workers Communist
|Raymonde Lebreux
| style="text-align:right;" |469
| style="text-align:right;" |1.63  
| style="text-align:right;" |

|Independent
|Basile Papachristou
| style="text-align:right;" |263
| style="text-align:right;" |0.91
| style="text-align:right;" |

|Freedom of Choice
|Stephen J Smith
| style="text-align:right;" |252
| style="text-align:right;" |0.88
| style="text-align:right;" |

|Independent
|Sotirios Athanasiou
| style="text-align:right;" |73
| style="text-align:right;" |0.25
| style="text-align:right;" |
|- style="background-color:white"
! style="text-align:right;" colspan=3 |Total valid votes
! style="text-align:right;" |28,830
! style="text-align:right;" |98.67
! style="text-align:right;" |
|- style="background-color:white"
! style="text-align:right;" colspan=3 |Rejected and declined votes
! style="text-align:right;" |389
! style="text-align:right;" |1.33
! style="text-align:right;" |
|- style="background-color:white"
! style="text-align:right;" colspan=3 |Turnout
! style="text-align:right;" |29,219
! style="text-align:right;" |80.21
! style="text-align:right;" |
|- style="background-color:white"
! style="text-align:right;" colspan=3 |Electors on the lists
! style="text-align:right;" |36,428
! style="text-align:right;" |
! style="text-align:right;" |

References
 

1948 births
Living people
Greek emigrants to Canada
People from Villeray–Saint-Michel–Parc-Extension
Quebec Liberal Party MNAs
McGill University alumni
Recipients of the Order of the Phoenix (Greece)
Vice Presidents of the National Assembly of Quebec
21st-century Canadian politicians
Members of the Executive Council of Quebec